John R. Howard Hall is an academic building on the Lewis & Clark College campus, in Portland, Oregon. The building opened in 2004, and was dedicated in 2005.

References

External links
 

2004 establishments in Oregon
Buildings and structures completed in 2004
Lewis & Clark College buildings

Buildings and structures in Portland, Oregon